Comedians and Songs (Spanish: Cómicos y canciones) is a 1960 Mexican comedy crime film directed by Fernando Cortés and starring Marco Antonio Campos, Gaspar Henaine, and Silvia Fournier.

Cast
 Marco Antonio Campos as Viruta  
 Gaspar Henaine as Capulina  
 Silvia Fournier as Lilia  
 María Eugenia San Martín as Carmen  
 Jaime Fernández as El Charrascas  
 Pedro de Aguillón as Mister Fong  
 Rosa Cué
 Arturo Castro 'Bigotón' as El Jefe  
 José Chávez
 Julián de Meriche 
 Ernesto Finance as El Comandante  
 Guillermo Hernández

References

Bibliography 
 Emilio García Riera. Historia documental del cine mexicano: 1959-1960. Universidad de Guadalajara, 1994.

External links 
 

1960 films
1960s crime comedy films
Mexican crime comedy films
1960s Spanish-language films
Films directed by Fernando Cortés
1960 comedy films
1960s Mexican films